"Stay: Now I'm Here" is the tenth single of  Dream. The single reached #19 on the weekly Oricon charts and charted for two weeks. The title song was used in a CM for Kanebo Hadabisei (in which none of dream's members appear).

Track list
 STAY ~now I'm here~
 STAY ~now I'm here~ （Instrumental）

Credits
 Mai Matsumuro (Lyrics)
 Kunio Tago (Music)
 Ken Harada (Arrangement)

External links
 http://www.oricon.co.jp/music/release/d/458165/1/

J-pop songs
2001 singles
Songs written by Mai Matsumuro
2001 songs
Avex Trax singles